Decernotinib is an inhibitor of Janus kinase 3 (JAK3) discovered through a process of inhouse screening of a chemical compound library. Decernotinib also had the name VX-509 in development phase.  It is an experimental drug with high selectivity for JAK3, which demonstrates good efficacy in vivo in the rat host versus graft model (HvG). It is being studied in clinical trials at Vertex.

References

Experimental drugs
Pyrrolopyridines
Pyrimidines
Trifluoromethyl compounds
Protein kinase inhibitors